Robert Breitbard (April 28, 1919 – May 17, 2010) was an American football coach and professional sports owner. He served as the head football coach at San Diego State University in 1945. A member of the Greater San Diego Sports Council, Breitbard was instrumental in the construction of the San Diego Sports Arena. He was the first principal owner of the San Diego Rockets franchise of the National Basketball Association, which he owned from 1967 to 1972. He also owned the San Diego Gulls of the Western Hockey League.

Head coaching record

References

1919 births
2010 deaths
American football centers
Houston Rockets owners
National Basketball Association owners
San Diego State Aztecs football coaches
San Diego State Aztecs football players
Players of American football from San Diego
Ice hockey people from California